Kenneth Horsnell (born 3 September 1933) is an Australian cricketer. He played in sixteen first-class matches for South Australia between 1953 and 1961.

See also
 List of South Australian representative cricketers

References

External links
 

1933 births
Living people
Australian cricketers
South Australia cricketers
Cricketers from Adelaide